The 1999 Meistriliiga was the ninth season of the Meistriliiga, Estonia's premier football league. Levadia won their first title.

League table

Relegation play-off

Lelle won 4–2 on aggregate and retained their Meistriliiga spot; however, Lelle ceded their league entry to FC Valga both being associate clubs of Flora

Results
Each team played every opponent four times, twice at home and twice on the road, for a total of 36 games.

First half of season

Second half of season

Top scorers

References

Estonia - Estonia 1999 (RSSSF)

Meistriliiga seasons
1
Estonia
Estonia